Perumpilavu is a village located in north of Kunnamkulam in Thrissur district in the state of Kerala in India. It is famous for Perumpilavu Cattle Market ( Perumpilavu Chantha). Lots of restaurants are there in Perumpilavu and most of them are open at late nights. Perumpilavu is a hub of prominent educational institutes such as Internet Marketing Academy, Ansar English Medium School and Women's College, Royal Engineering College, PSM Dental college.

References

Villages in Thrissur district